David Alexander Holloway (born December 4, 1983) is a former American football linebacker. He was signed by the Arizona Cardinals as an undrafted free agent in 2007. He played college football at Maryland.

Holloway has also been a member of the Washington Redskins, Cleveland Browns and Jacksonville Jaguars. He is the son of former NFL offensive lineman Brian Holloway.

Professional career

Cleveland Browns
On July 26, 2009, Holloway was released when the Cleveland Browns signed Alex Mack.

Jacksonville Jaguars
Holloway signed with the Jacksonville Jaguars on August 4, 2009. He was waived on August 7.

Second stint with Cardinals
Holloway re-signed with the Arizona Cardinals on August 26, 2009. He was waived on September 4, 2009.

Personal life
His father, Brian Holloway, was a Pro Bowl offensive lineman in the NFL in the 1980s. His maternal grandfather, John McKenzie, played in the National Hockey League. He is a 2002 graduate of The Albany Academy in Albany, New York.

External links
Arizona Cardinals bio
Jacksonville Jaguars bio
Maryland Terrapins bio

1983 births
Living people
People from Stephentown, New York
Players of American football from New York (state)
American football linebackers
Maryland Terrapins football players
Arizona Cardinals players
Washington Redskins players
Cleveland Browns players
Jacksonville Jaguars players
The Albany Academy alumni